Mustafa Sarp (born November 5, 1980, in Bakırköy, Istanbul, Turkey) is a Turkish footballer who last played for Manisaspor as a midfielder.

Career
On Tuesday, June 9, 2009, it was announced that he is a member of Galatasaray. Sarp has chosen number 16 as his club number.

He scored his first goal for Galatasaray at 23 July 2009, against Tobol.

On 2 September 2011 he mutually terminated the contract by waived the wage not yet paid to Sarp of US$400,000. He joined Samsunspor on free transfer.

Career statistics

References

External links

Profile at Galatasaray.org
Statistics at TFF.org 
 

1980 births
Living people
Turkish footballers
Süper Lig players
Turkey B international footballers
Gaziosmanpaşaspor footballers
Mersin İdman Yurdu footballers
Ankaraspor footballers
Kayseri Erciyesspor footballers
Bursaspor footballers
Galatasaray S.K. footballers
Samsunspor footballers
Kardemir Karabükspor footballers
Elazığspor footballers
İstanbul Başakşehir F.K. players
Manisaspor footballers
TFF First League players
Association football midfielders
People from Bakırköy
Footballers from Istanbul